Valse Triste is a ballet choreographed by Peter Martins when he was balletmaster at the New York City Ballet to Sibelius's eponymous waltz as well as the music called Scene with Cranes from his incidental music for the play Kuolema (Death). The crane is a symbol of death in Finnish literature. The premiere took place on May 23, 1985, at the New York State Theater, Lincoln Center, with original lighting by Ronald Bates and current lighting by Mark Stanley.

Original cast
Patricia McBride 
Ib Andersen

Notes

Articles 
NY Times, Elizabeth Kaye, January 1, 1995

Reviews 
NY Times, Alastair Macaulay, January 25, 2008 
NY Times, Jack Anderson, January 6, 2000 
NY Times, Jennifer Dunning, June 22, 1992

New York City Ballet repertory
Ballets by Peter Martins
1985 ballet premieres
Ballets to the music of Jean Sibelius
Ballets designed by Ronald Bates